Leaves from the Inn of the Last Home is an accessory for the Advanced Dungeons & Dragons fantasy role-playing game.

Contents
Leaves from the Inn of the Last Home is a collection of Dragonlance essays, legends, and recipes. Astinus of Palanthas discusses the creation of Krynn, Bertrem explains the difference between kender and gully dwarves, and Lord Gunthar shares his notes on dragon tactics. A short story by Weis and Hickman sheds light on the first meeting of Flint, Tanis, and the other Dragonlance companions.

Leaves from the Inn of the Last Home includes essays on the history of Krynn and its numerous races. The book includes information on the Dragonlance series main heroes, as well as runic and numerological analyses of their personalities and backgrounds. Also included is a section on herbalism and the more useful herbs of the land. The book includes a collection of poetry by author Michael Williams, together with all the scores for its accompaniment including one piece for Bass voice and the Bassoon. One whole section of the book is devoted to extracts from Tika Waylan's cookbook.

Publication history
Leaves from the Inn of the Last Home was edited by Margaret Weis and Tracy Hickman, and first published by TSR, Inc. in 1987. This is a 256-page soft-bound book, subtitled "The Complete Krynn Sourcebook".

Reception
Phil Gallagher reviewed Leaves from the Inn of the Last Home for White Dwarf #91. He starts the review by saying "As the saying goes, 'All good things must come to and end' - but the Dragonlance series just goes on and on..." He cautions that fans of the epic series hoping for "all the information that should have been in DL5 Dragons of Mystery are going to be disappointed". He did note that a DM devoted to the setting would find the essays on the history of legends of Krynn and its races "invaluable in recreating the atmosphere of the place". He went on to say: "Unfortunately, all this praiseworthy material - splendidly illustrated and presented though it is - has been lumped together with an odd-ball assortment of Dragonlance trivia."  Gallagher complained that with the "so-called 'authentic'" runic and numerological analyses of the Dragonlance heroes "no attempts are made to explain how such occult charts are generated or interpreted!" and that the section on herbalism included "no suggestions as to how these might be incorporated into the campaign or what their effects in terms of game mechanics might be". He concluded the review by saying: "You may have guessed that I'm not one of the greatest Dragonlance fans, and maybe my lack of involvement in the series is the reason why I can't see the relevance (or even the interest) of much of this material. Be that as it may, there is no way I can recommend this book to anyone other than Dragonlance fanatics and completists.

Rick Swan reviewed Leaves from the Inn of the Last Home for Dragon magazine #206 (June 1994). According to Swan, "this delightful collection [...] perfectly captures the fairy tale ambiance of the original novel trilogy". As for the recipes, he notes that "Flamestrike's Soup tastes like a beefy minestrone, bland but filling. Also, I'd substitute melted baking chocolate for the powdered cocoa in the Nuitari cookies."

References

Dragonlance supplements
Role-playing game supplements introduced in 1987